Sarajevo Synagogue (Bosnian: Sinagoga u Sarajevu / Синагога у Сарајеву) is Sarajevo's primary and largest synagogue and is located on the south bank of the river Miljacka. It was constructed in 1902 and remains the only functioning synagogue in Sarajevo today.

History

A Sephardi synagogue (also known as Sijavuš-pašina daira or Velika Avlija) is known to have been built in 1581 with the donation of Turkish Beylerbey Sijamush Pasha to help members of the Jewish community in Sarajevo who were poor. By the end of the 16th century, the space encompassing Velika Avlija was turned into the first synagogue. The building burned down in both 1679 and 1778, and was rebuilt each time. It now serves as a Jewish museum. Next door is the New Synagogue (Novi Hram) serving as an art gallery owned by the Jewish community of Sarajevo.

Ashkenazi Jews arrived in Sarajevo during the Austro-Hungarian Empire in the late 19th century. The Sarajevo Ashkenazi synagogue was designed by Karel Pařík and built in 1902.

The Sephardic community constructed their own Il Kal Grande synagogue of 1932, acknowledged as the largest and most ornate synagogues in the Balkans. It was devastated by the Nazis in 1941 during World War II, but the Ashkenazi synagogue was able to escape destruction.

The Holocaust in the 1940s and the civil war during the 1990s left fewer than 5,700 Jews in former Yugoslavia. The Jewish community, like the entire country, was once defined by its unique combination of eastern and western traditions. Populations of Sephardi and Ashkenazi Jews peacefully co-existed with their Christian and Muslim neighbors in Sarajevo and elsewhere in Bosnia and Herzegovina.

Architecture 
It was designed in the Moorish Revival, which was a popular choice for synagogues in the empire.

The synagogue has enormous arches with richly painted decorations. The high, ornate ceiling was highlighted by a ten-pointed star. Today the synagogue is confined to the women's galleries on the upper floor. At the entrance, a stone menorah commemorates the 400-year anniversary of the Jews in Bosnia and Herzegovina.

The building was renovated in the 2000s.

See also
 History of the Jews in Bosnia and Herzegovina
 Sarajevo Haggadah
 Il Kal Grande, Sephardi synagogue of Sarajevo

References

External links 

Bosnia and Herzegovina: Ashkenazi Synagogue, (International Student Travel Confederation)

Religious buildings and structures in Sarajevo
Synagogues in Bosnia and Herzegovina
Ashkenazi synagogues
Ashkenazi Jewish culture in Europe
Buildings and structures in Sarajevo
National Monuments of Bosnia and Herzegovina
Rebuilt buildings and structures in Bosnia and Herzegovina
Synagogues completed in 1902
Moorish Revival synagogues
Moorish Revival architecture in Bosnia and Herzegovina
Tourist attractions in Sarajevo